EANS may refer to:
 Alonso Eans, Galician clergyman
 Emergency Action Notification System
 Estonian Air Navigation Services

See also 
 EAN (disambiguation)